K-PAX is a 2001 science fiction mystery film based on Gene Brewer's 1995 novel of the same name. An  American-German co-production, it was directed by Iain Softley, starring Kevin Spacey, Jeff Bridges, Mary McCormack, and Alfre Woodard. The film is about a psychiatric patient who claims to be an alien from the planet K-PAX. During his treatment, the patient demonstrates an outlook on life that ultimately proves inspirational for his fellow patients and especially for his psychiatrist.

Plot
After claiming he is an extraterrestrial from the planet 'K-PAX', 1,000 light years away in the Lyra constellation, prot (not capitalized and pronounced with a long O, rhyming with boat) is committed to the Psychiatric Institute of Manhattan. There, psychiatrist Dr. Mark Powell attempts to cure him of his apparent delusions. However, prot is unwavering in his ability to provide cogent answers to questions about himself, K-PAX, and its civilizations. His medical examination only reinforces his story, as prot can see ultraviolet light and he is completely resistant to the effects of Thorazine. Powell introduces him to a group of astrophysicists who are befuddled when prot displays a highly detailed level of knowledge about his claimed star system that was unknown to them.

prot also wins over the other patients at the Institute, each of whom believes unquestioningly that he is indeed from K-PAX. prot, who claims to have journeyed to Earth by means of "faster-than-light travel," explains that he can take one person with him when he returns. Thereafter, most of the patients at the Institute ask prot to take them with him.

Upon learning that many of his patients expect to leave Earth on July 27, Powell confronts prot, who explains that it is a predetermined date. However, Powell believes this to be a significant date in prot's life, a day on which he suffered a severe psychological trauma. Powell decides to subject prot to regression hypnosis, which works well. Using information gained from these sessions, Powell figures out that prot may simply be an alter ego of Robert Porter, a man from New Mexico who worked as a 'knocker' (animal slaughterer) in a local abbatoir, who attempted suicide in 1996 after his wife and child were murdered. Powell tries to confront prot with this knowledge, showing him a photo of Robert Porter in a high school yearbook and stating that it is in fact prot himself; but prot's reaction is one of bemusement, and he cryptically tells Powell that he hopes he will take good care of Robert now that he has found him.

On July 27 as the hospital staff watch, the camera in prot's room cuts to static at the precise time prot said he would leave Earth. Powell finds Porter lying on the floor in his room, catatonic, prot having apparently left Porter's body for the light travel back to K-PAX. As Robert is being wheeled out of the room, the other patients do not recognize him as prot and say that prot has gone. In addition, one of the patients is missing: Bess, a woman who had remained mute since her home was destroyed in a fire and who had been among the patients that asked to go to K-PAX with prot. She is never found. The other patients believe that prot has taken her to K-PAX. Powell continues to take care of the catatonic Porter and tells him about how the patients he helped have gone on to live normal lives again, but Robert does not respond. Powell is left with no absolute answer as to whether prot was in fact an alien entity or just a coping mechanism of the traumatized Porter, but seems far from convinced that Porter's behavior was a delusion.

In a final voiceover, prot explains to Powell that the people of K-PAX have discovered that our universe will repeat its events again and again, so the mistakes we make will be repeated forever. prot encourages Powell to make this time count, as it is the only chance we have. Inspired, Powell begins a new, better life by reconciling with his estranged son Michael.

Cast

Production

Will Smith was offered the role of prot/Robert Porter. Kevin Spacey was originally offered the role of Dr. Mark Powell, but instead landed on the role of Prot.

Reception
K-PAX received mixed reviews from critics. On Rotten Tomatoes, it has an approval rating of 42%, based on 141 reviews, with an average rating of 5.10/10. The website's consensus states, "For those who have seen One Flew Over the Cuckoo's Nest or Starman, K-PAX may not hold anything new. The movie works best as a showcase for Kevin Spacey and Jeff Bridges." The film has a weighted average score of 49 out of 100 on Metacritic, based on 31 reviews, indicating "mixed or average reviews".

Roger Ebert of the Chicago Sun-Times gave K-PAX three stars out of four and wrote: "I admired how the movie tantalized us with possibilities and allowed the doctor and patient to talk sensibly, if strangely, about the difference between the delusional and that which is simply very unlikely." A.O. Scott, wrote in The New York Times: "K-PAX is a draggy, earnest exercise in pseudo-spiritual uplift, recycling romantic hokum about extra-terrestrial life and mental illness with wide-eyed sincerity." For Variety, Robert Koehler wrote "'K-PAX' gives off a great deal of light but generates little heat in a drama that aspires to cosmic themes but ends up with plain, comforting homilies." Claudia Puig at USA Today wrote "Besides being saddled with the year's worst title...this misguided movie is shackled by its own overreaching sense of importance and foggy earnestness."

Box office
K-PAX grossed $17.5 million and ranked number 1 in its opening weekend ahead of Warner Bros.' Thirteen Ghosts and 20th Century Fox's From Hell. It plunged into fourth place when Monsters, Inc. was released during its second weekend. The film was a box-office disappointment, making only $65,001,485 worldwide vs. a budget of $68 million, including $50,338,485 in North America and $14,663,000 internationally.

Plagiarism lawsuit
Argentinian director Eliseo Subiela claimed that K-Pax plagiarized his 1986 film Man Facing Southeast. He said "it's a copy, but a good quality one". Subsequently, Gene Brewer and others connected with K-PAX were sued in November 2001. The complaint was withdrawn because the trial stretched over time and Subiela lacked sufficient funds to continue the litigation. Subiela claimed until his death in late 2016 that his film was plagiarized by the makers of K-PAX. Brewer later released a memoir exploring his inspiration for the books, titled Creating K-PAX or Are You Sure You Want to Be a Writer?

References

Further reading

External links

 
 
 
 
 

2001 films
2001 drama films
2001 science fiction films
American drama films
Films scored by Edward Shearmur
Films about hypnosis
Films based on science fiction novels
Films about psychiatry
Films set in 2001
Films set in psychiatric hospitals
Films involved in plagiarism controversies
Films directed by Iain Softley
2000s English-language films
2000s American films